The Battle of Roßbrunn was the last battle of the Main Campaign in the Austro-Prussian War. It took place on July 26, 1866 near Roßbrunn, Uettingen and Hettstadt.

Background
Prince Karl of Bavaria , the Commander-in-Chief of the West German Army of the German Confederation, planned an offensive of the VII and VIII Federal Corps against the Prussian Army under Edwin von Manteuffel on July 16, 1866 however the VIII. Corps was no longer ready to fight and withdrew towards Würzburg. Prince Karl wanted at least to hold the plateau near Hettstadt and thus Würzburg in order not to weaken Bavaria's negotiating position any further in the upcoming peace negotiations.

The Battle

Fighting at Uettingen and Roßbrunn
The 2nd combined infantry brigade of the Prussian Flies Division under Major General Ludwig von Korth occupied Uettingen with two battalions late on July 25 and moved into night quarters west of the village with the majority of the battalions.

The Bavarian 2nd Division under Major General Maximilian von Feder and the Bavarian 4th Division under Major General Jakob von Hartmann were set up near Roßbrunn. The entire rest of the Bavarian Army was concentrated behind it between Hettstadt and Waldbrunn.

At 4 a.m., units of the Bavarian 5th Infantry Regiment attacked the Prussians in Uettingen.

Major General von Korth had the Kirchberg stormed on the left flank by the 4th Posensche Infantry Regiment No. 59. to combat units of the Bavarian 5th and 13th Infantry Regiments as well as the 8th Jäger Battalion defended the Kirchberg, but could not hold it and had to retreat to the Hessnert with considerable losses.

The Magdeburg Fusilier Regiment No. 36 under Colonel Hugo von Thile stormed the Osnert on the right flank, with considerable losses (including two battalion commanders). Units of the Bavarian 7th and 10th Infantry Regiments had tried in vain to hold the mountain.

The Prussians succeeded in taking the heights (Kirchberg, Osnert, Heiligenberg) near Uettingen, which dominated the village and the road to Würzburg, after the Bavarians had cleared the Heiligenberg.

An artillery duel took place in the center, although the Prussians were only able to make progress after the two flanking mountains had been captured. Around 10 o'clock the Bavarians vacated their position at Roßbrunn and took up a new position on the Hettstadt plateau.

Cavalry battle at the Hettstädter Höfe
Prussian cavalry under Colonel Thassilo von Nidda explored the terrain, with a smaller unit coming into battle with Bavarian cavalry. In the pursuit of the Bavarians, the unit came into the Bavarian infantry fire and suffered considerable losses. Colonel Nidda made a new attack with his whole brigade of eight squadrons and initially threw back the Bavarian cavalry. Thereupon the Bavarians threw four cavalry regiments (Three cuirassier and one ulan regiment) into the battle and put the Prussians to flight. The last battle ended with a victory for Bavaria.

Legacy
Several memorials for the fallen soldiers of the Prussian regiments and the Bavarian 4th Division were erected in the Uettingen cemetery 

For the fallen soldiers of the royal Bavarian infantry regiments 4, 7 and 10, a memorial in the shape of a cross was erected on the Vogelsberg south of Roßbrunn.

Literature
 Österreichs Kämpfe im Jahre 1866. Vom K.und K. Generalstab. Bureau für Kriegsgeschichte, 5. Band, Wien 1869, S. 163–170. online in der Google-Buchsuche
 Der Feldzug von 1866 in Deutschland. Kriegsgeschichtliche Abteilung des großen Generalstabes, Berlin 1867, S. 676–687. online in der Google-Buchsuche
 Antheil der königlich bayerischen Armee am Kriege des Jahres 1866. bearbeitet vom Generalquartiermeister-Stabe, München 1868, S. 177–199. online in der Google-Buchsuche
 August Mels: Von der Elbe bis zur Tauber. Der Feldzug der Preußischen Main-Armee im Sommer 1866. Vom Berichterstatter des Daheim. Mit Karten und vielen Illustrationen. Velhagen & Klasing, Bielefeld & Leipzig 1867, S. 251–263. online in der Google-Buchsuche
 Theodor Fontane: Der deutsche Krieg von 1866. 2. Band: Der Feldzug in West- und Mitteldeutschland. Berlin 1871. S. 235–254. online in der Google-Buchsuche
 Emil Knorr: Der Feldzug des Jahres 1866 in West- und Süddeutschland nach authentischen Quellen bearbeitet. 3. Band, Hamburg 1870, S. 230–266. online bei der Bayerischen Staatsbibliothek

References

External links 

Roßbrunn
July 1866 events
Roßbrunn
Roßbrunn
Battles in Bavaria
1866 in Germany
Roßbrunn